Ostrowskie Lake  is a lake in Kuyavian-Pomeranian Voivodeship, north-central Poland, in the Gmina Jeziora Wielkie. It's a Glacial lake more specifically, a Ribbon lake.

Lakes of Poland
Lakes of Kuyavian-Pomeranian Voivodeship
Mogilno County